La Plata Airport  is a small airport serving La Plata, the capital city of the Buenos Aires Province, Argentina.

The La Plata VOR and non-directional beacon (Idents: PTA) are located on the field.

As of 2023 no commercial flights fly into LPG. The nearest commercially serviced airport is Ministro Pistarini International Airport in Buenos Aires.

See also

Transport in Argentina
List of airports in Argentina

References

External links
OpenStreetMap - La Plata Airport

Airports in Argentina